Mary Nogueras Frampton (1930–2006) was one of the first female photographers employed by the Los Angeles Times. She was organizer of the Save Our Coast environmental organization.

Biography
Mary Nogueras was born in New York City in 1930 and was brought to San Bernardino, California, by her parents, Eugenio Nogueras, the editor and publisher of El Sol de San Bernardino, a weekly Spanish-language newspaper, and Edithe Hethcock, a sculptor. She attended San Bernardino High School and San Bernardino Valley College, where she studied advertising and journalism. She was employed as a photographer in 1950 by the San Bernardino Sun, briefly in the public relations office of the Beverly Hills Hotel, and in 1954 by the Santa Monica Outlook. She was hired by the Los Angeles Times in 1956 and retired from there in 1987.

Frampton "was a key environmental figure" in Malibu, California, "battling developers and working to preserve open spaces and protect marine life." Mark Gold, executive director of  Heal the Bay, said she was one of “the original coastal environmental advocates that meant so much during the '70s and '80s.”

She was married to a Times editor, Bob Frampton, who died before her.

Awards
In 1966, Frampton won a Penney-Missouri award as Women's Page Photographer of the Year, and in 1970, she won a second Penney-Missouri for feature photography.

References

External links
  ManuelRDelgado.com, in which Mary Frampton is mentioned
 Mary Frampton papers at Pepperdine University. Series 1: Personal Files contain materials from Mary Nogueras Frampton's personal life. Many materials belonged to her mother, sculptor Edith Hethcock Nogueras, including old family photographs, correspondence with family and her husband, Eugenio Nogueras, sketches, memorabilia, and an official patent for a hydrofoil device. Mary Frampton's childhood and adolescence and are also documented through photographs, newspaper clippings, and school materials. Items from Frampton's later life include photographs, largely of her husband, Robert Frampton, their dogs and various homes together, as well as hand-drawn holiday cards and albums from Mary Frampton's memorial service. Series 2: Professional files contain materials related to Mary Nogueras Frampton's work as a photographer. The majority of the materials date from her early career at the San Bernardino Sun-Telegram, including a substantial portfolio of her photographs and articles. Also included are correspondence, press passes, awards and honors, magazines featuring Frampton's work, and cartoons presumably drawn by fellow staff at the paper about Frampton. There are also several issues of Among Ourselves, the employee newspaper of the Los Angeles Times. Series Three: Save Our Coast features materials from Mary Frampton's time directing this organization to advocate for various environmental causes in Malibu. She was particularly interested in establishing a Marine Sanctuary off the coast of Malibu, but she was also involved in many other causes, such as cleaning up the Malibu watershed and Lagoon, preventing L.A. County from building sewers in Malibu, fighting for Malibu cityhood, campaigning to free Keiko (the orca used in the film Free Willy), defending dolphins and sea life in general, and educating schoolchildren about the importance of caring for the environment. This series contains correspondence, photographs, newspaper clippings, reports, artwork and memorabilia reflecting Frampton's involvement with these causes. It contains posters and essays created by elementary school children in 1989 as part of a city-wide contest promoting awareness around protecting coastal ecosystems.

1930 births
2006 deaths
20th-century American photographers
American environmentalists
American women environmentalists
20th-century American women photographers
21st-century American women